La Bañeza is a municipality located in the province of León, Castile and León, Spain. According to the 2010 census (INE), the municipality had a population of 11,050 inhabitants.

It is the capital of the region of Tierra de La Bañeza.

Zone of astur population its territory was a part of Conventus Asturum during the Roman times. The city was founded in the 9th century by conde Gatón from two small villages San Pedro de Périx and Bani Eiza. La Bañeza hosted a marquis in the modern age and, in the end of the 19th century, became a transformation with the railroad arrival in 1896. A year earlier, in 1895, Queen Regent Maria Christina of Austria gives the title of city.
Within his heritage highlight the churches of San Salvador and Santa María, among of several celebrations as the carnival, holy week and the August festivities during which they held the exclusive motorcycle street race.
Within its monuments, it highlights the churches of San Salvador and Santa María. They are several celebrations during the year and the more important are the Carnivals, Holy Week, and the motorbikes race in August, one of the last urban motor-race in the world. All of this makes the city a great place for the tourism.

The motorcycle race is called the La Bañeza Grand Prix.

See also 
 Tierra de La Bañeza
 Carnival of La Bañeza
 Kingdom of León
 Leonese language
 La Bañeza Grand Prix

References

External links
 Carnival of La Bañeza.
 La Bañeza.

Municipalities in the Province of León
Tierra de La Bañeza